Kampung Pokok Mangga is a village in Malacca City, the capital of the Malaysian state of Malacca.

References

Towns in Malacca